Leandro da Silva (born 22 September 1988) is a Brazilian footballer who plays as a right back.

Club career
Born in Sorocaba, São Paulo, Leandro graduated from São Caetano's youth setup, but made his senior debuts with hometown's Atlético Sorocaba in 2008, aged 19. On 14 July 2011 he signed a short-term deal with Santos.

Leandro played his first match as a professional on 7 August 2011, starting and being booked in a 1–0 home win against Ceará for the Série A championship. However, he only appeared in four matches during the campaign, and was subsequently released.

In January 2012 Leandro joined Guaratinguetá. After being used mostly as a backup during that year's Campeonato Paulista, he was an undisputed starter during the Série B season, appearing in 30 matches and scoring once.

On 20 December 2012 Leandro moved to Ituano, appearing regularly in the state leagues. On 9 May 2013 he was presented at América Mineiro.

On 20 January 2014 Leandro signed for Figueirense. Initially as a backup, he appeared in all state league matches, and was an undisputed starter for the side during the campaign.

Career statistics

References

External links
 

1988 births
Living people
Brazilian footballers
Association football defenders
Campeonato Brasileiro Série A players
Campeonato Brasileiro Série B players
Santos FC players
Guaratinguetá Futebol players
Ituano FC players
América Futebol Clube (MG) players
Figueirense FC players
Avaí FC players
Ceará Sporting Club players
Coritiba Foot Ball Club players
People from Sorocaba
Footballers from São Paulo (state)